Plecodus paradoxus is a species of cichlid endemic to Lake Tanganyika.  This fish is a scale-eater, gathering in large schools exceeding 500 individuals and eating the scales of other fish.  This species can reach a length of  TL.

References

Plecodus
Taxa named by George Albert Boulenger
Fish described in 1898
Taxonomy articles created by Polbot